Elsie Louise Ferguson (August 19, 1883 – November 15, 1961) was an American stage and film actress. Seen by some as an early feminist, she promoted suffrage, which she discussed in interviews, and supported animal rights.

Early life
Born in New York City, Elsie Ferguson was the only child of Hiram and Amelia Ferguson. Her father was a successful attorney. Raised and educated in Manhattan, she became interested in the theater at a young age and made her stage debut at 17 as a chorus girl in a musical comedy. For almost two years, from 1903 to 1905, she was a cast member in The Girl from Kays. In 1908, she was leading lady to Edgar Selwyn in Pierre of the Plains. By 1909, after several years apprenticeship under several producers, including Charles Frohman, Klaw & Erlanger, Charles Dillingham and Henry B. Harris, she was a major Broadway star, starring in Such a Little Queen. In 1910, she spent time on the stage in London. Actresses Evelyn Nesbit and Ethel Barrymore were friends of hers.

During World War I, a number of Broadway stars organized a campaign to sell Liberty Bonds from the theatre stage before the performance as well as at highly publicized appearances at places such as the New York Public Library. On one occasion, Ferguson is reputed to have sold $85,000 worth of bonds in less than an hour.

Stardom

At the peak of her popularity, several film studios offered her a contract but she declined them all until widely respected New York-based French director Maurice Tourneur proposed she appear in the lead role as a sophisticated patrician in his 1917 silent film Barbary Sheep. She also may have consented to films because she no longer had the protection of her Broadway employers Henry B. Harris, who died on the Titanic in 1912, and Charles Frohman, who perished on the Lusitania in 1915. Producer and director Adolph Zukor then signed her to an 18-film, three-year, $5,000-per-week contract.

Following this first film, Ferguson was billed prominently in promotional campaigns, and starred in two more films directed by Tourneur under a lucrative contract from Paramount Pictures that paid her $1,000 per day of filming in addition to her weekly contract income. Her only surviving complete silent film is The Witness for the Defense (1919), co-starring Warner Oland and performed as a play in 1911 by her friend Ethel Barrymore. A surviving fragment of footage of Ferguson from The Lie or The Avalanche can be seen in Paramount's The House That Shadows Built (1931). Other brief surviving footage of Ferguson is preserved in Paramount's A Trip to Paramountown (1922)

Continuing to play roles of elegant society women, Ferguson was quickly dubbed "The Aristocrat of the Silent Screen", but the aristocratic label also was because she was known as a difficult and sometimes arrogant personality with whom to work. Many of the films she agreed to do were because they were adaptations of stage plays with which she was familiar.

Elsie Ferguson eventually followed the move west and bought a home in the hills of Hollywood, California. In 1920, she traveled to the Middle East and Europe. She fell in love with Paris and the French Riviera, and within a few years, she bought a permanent home there. 

In 1921, she accepted another contract offer from Paramount Pictures to star in four films to be spread over a two-year period. One of these was the 1921 film entitled Forever in which she starred with Wallace Reid.

"Talkies" and retirement
Ferguson's last silent film before returning to Broadway was the 1925 drama The Unknown Lover. In 1930, she made her first sound film that also would be her final film, titled Scarlet Pages, which is now preserved in the Library of Congress. The film was based on a 1929 Broadway production of the same name that she also starred in. She was described as having a "pleasantly low-pitched voice with perfect diction."

Well known as difficult to work with, temperamental, and argumentative, she married four times. Following her final marriage at age 51, she and her husband acquired a farm in Connecticut and divided their time between it and her home in Cap d'Antibes. 

Ferguson made her final appearance on Broadway in 1943, at the age of 60, that met with critical acclaim. She played in Outrageous Fortune, a play written by her neighbor Rose Franken. The play closed eight weeks after it opened. Critics hailed Ferguson's performance as "glowing" and having "the charm and winning manner of old."

Ferguson died in Lawrence Memorial Hospital in New London, Connecticut, in 1961. She lived on an estate called White Gate Farms. She was interred in the Duck River Cemetery in Old Lyme, Connecticut. A very wealthy woman with no heirs and a lover of animals, she left a large part of her considerable estate to a variety of charities, including several for animal welfare.

Filmography

References

External links

 
 
 Elsie Ferguson photographic gallery NYP Library
 Elsie Ferguson at Virtual History
Elsie Ferguson in scenes from many of her lost films and stage scene with husband Frederick Worlock (Univ of Washington Sayre collection)
 Elsie Ferguson and Nance O'Neil in the 1927 play The House of Women

portrait of Ferguson in 1924(WaybackMachine),..flip side text(Wayback)
PeriodPaper
Ferguson and namesake niece, 1933
back Ferguson and niece 1933

1880s births
1961 deaths
American film actresses
American silent film actresses
19th-century American actresses
American stage actresses
Actresses from New York City
People from Old Lyme, Connecticut
American women in World War I
20th-century American actresses
Paramount Pictures contract players